Hahnenbach  may refer to:

 Hahnenbach, a municipality in Rhineland-Palatinate, Germany
 Hahnenbach (Boye), a river of North Rhine-Westphalia, Germany
 Hahnenbach (Wiedau), a river of Lower Saxony, Germany